Bledlow railway station was an intermediate station on the Wycombe Railway which served the Buckinghamshire village of Bledlow from 1862 to 1963. The possibility of reopening the line through Bledlow, which is now part of a long-distance footpath, has been explored by Chiltern Railways, the franchise holder for the Chiltern Main Line which runs through .

History

Four daily trains each way (one on Sundays) called at Thame, Bledlow, Princes Risborough,  and Maidenhead. Bledlow station was west of a level crossing on Sandpit Lane,  from the village from which it took its name. A two-storey brick station building was built at Bledlow at a cost of £1,003-13s-6d. It included a booking office and accommodation for the station master.

A  by  signal box with a 16-lever frame controlled traffic over the level crossing was next to the main station building. Electric train staff instruments were installed on the line to Thame in the 1890s. Consequently, Bledlow box ceased to signal trains in 1902, but it remained in use to operate the crossing gates.

A single siding equipped with a 2-ton yard crane handled goods traffic which consisted of watercress and English elm boles for trawling nets made locally in Longwick. Figures from 1933 show that  of goods were sent from the station, whilst  tons of goods were received. In the same period 5,338 passenger tickets were issued and 6,529 parcels forwarded.

By 1957 freight had declined to only  were forwarded and  received. By November 1961 the line itself was carrying an average of 524 passengers per week. On the basis of an estimated saving of £34,372, British Railways withdrew passenger services between Oxford and Princes Risborough from January 1963.

In September 1965 Bledlow level crossing was converted to automatic half-barriers enabling the signal box to be closed. Freight traffic was withdrawn and British Rail closed the line between Thame and Princes Risborough in October 1991.

Routes

Present day

The station building survives and has been extended as a bed and breakfast run by the granddaughter of Percy Smith, Bledlow's third station master who worked at the station between 1918 and 1950. The signal box has been demolished and the trackbed is now part of the Phoenix Trail, a long-distance footpath and cycleway.

As part of its preparations for its bid to run the Chiltern Railways franchise, Chiltern Railways announced in 2000 that it was considering the possibility of reinstating passenger services on the line between Oxford and Risborough, the cost of which it estimated at £250 million. Chiltern Railways decided instead to build a  link between the Oxford to Bicester Line and the Chiltern Main Line to run direct services between Oxford and London via .

References

Sources

External links
 Station on navigable 1946 O.S. map
 The Old Station - Bledlow

Disused railway stations in Buckinghamshire
Former Great Western Railway stations
Railway stations in Great Britain opened in 1862
Railway stations in Great Britain closed in 1963
1862 establishments in England